Sonia Mercedes Revenga de la Rosa is a pageant titleholder, was born in Caracas, Venezuela on January 21, 1946. She is the Miss Venezuela titleholder for 1964, and was the official representative of Venezuela to the Miss Universe 1964 pageant held in Miami Beach, Florida, United States, on August 1, 1964, when she classified in the Top 15 semifinalists.

References

External links
Miss Venezuela Official Website
Miss Universe Official Website

1946 births
Living people
Miss Universe 1964 contestants
Miss Venezuela winners
People from Caracas